Deroceras tarracense is a species of terrestrial slugs in the family Agriolimacidae. This species is endemic to Spain, where it occurs abundantly in the Sierra del Montsant, in the province of Tarragona.

References

External links 
  Deroceras (Plathystimulus) tarracense. Institudo Universitario de Investigación - CIBIO.

Further reading 
 Regteren Altena, C.C. van, 1969, "Notes sur les limaces. 14. Sur trois espèces de Deroceras de la Catalogne, dont deux nouvelles."  Journal de Conchyliologie. 62: 101-108.

Agriolimacidae
Endemic fauna of Spain
Molluscs of Europe
Gastropods described in 1969
Taxonomy articles created by Polbot